Hastatis femoralis is a species of beetle in the family Cerambycidae. It was described by Hermann Burmeister in 1865. It is known from Argentina.

References

Calliini
Beetles described in 1865